Pierre-Gabriel Gardel (4 February 1758, in Nancy, France – 18 October 1840, in Paris) was a French ballet dancer, ballet master, violinist, and composer. He was the younger brother of Maximilien Gardel, seventeen years his senior. In 1795 he married the dancer Marie Miller, whom he showcased in many of his works.

Career
Entering the school of the Opéra de Paris (Paris Opera) in 1772, he began his studies under his brother's watch. He became a soloist in 1780, but had to give up his performing career for health reasons, paired with the rising jealousy of his contemporary Auguste Vestris, who was a natural technician. Upon his brother Maximillien's death in 1787, Pierre took over as the Opera's ballet master.

Assisted by Louis Milon, Gardel went on to head the Ballet de l'Opéra de Paris for 40 years, adapting to the turmoil of the French Revolution and the reign of Napoleon.

His first three ballets: Le Jugement de Pâris (1787), Psyché (1790), Télémaque (1790) drew upon classical myths and were considered compatible with the old regime. As the French Revolution caused a political upheaval, Gardel created patriotic dances which combined political content with neoclassical ideas. He collaborated with Jacques-Louis David, a painter who shared Gardel's views on showcasing the Revolution's ideas in works of art. In L'Offrande à la Liberté (1792) Gardel reproduced the events of the Revolution as an opera with music composed by François-Joseph Gossec. It included the revolutionary national anthem The Marseillaise, which was sung on stage.

Pierre Gardel argued that strong technical dancing was equally important to a ballet's story and theatrics.  He was influenced by Noverre's reforms, although Gardel didn't see the need to limit technique when including pantomime. He kept mime to a minimum and cast those with natural dramatic ability.  His choreography offered dancers what he saw as challenging and dramatic work.  Outside of the Opera ballet masters were focusing on pantomime. It was at this time that Gardel enabled changes in the training to reflect his focus on expanding technique to encompass great bodily feats. Gardel allowed and encouraged the creation of divertissements for the dancers. Auguste Vestris was a principal dancer at this time and well known for pushing the boundaries of turning and jumping. The very thing that caused Gardel discomfort as a dancer became valuable once Gardel became the Opéra's ballet master.

The uniformity of training that the Opera is known for was first seen under his rule. Criticized for not allowing outside choreographers access to his dancers "he kept them in a type of artistic isolation." (Au 42)  Some argue that Gardel's leadership was the reason that so few notable dancers emerged from the Opera during and in the years that followed his reign. A talented choreographer, he enthused the public from his first productions in 1790 right through to those just before his retirement. In 1820 he began lessening his work load, opting to create works for the operas, rather than full ballets. From 1820, the creation of ballets was transferred to Jean-Pierre Aumer, although Gardel didn't step down from his position and fully retire until 1827.

Main works
All put on at the Opéra de Paris.
 1784 : Dardanus
 1786 : Les Sauvages
 1790 : Télémaque dans l'île de Calypso
 1790 : Psyché
 1791 : Bacchus et Ariane
 1793 : Le Jugement de Pâris
 1800 : La Dansomanie
 1802 : Le Retour de Zéphire
 1803 : Daphnis et Pandore
 1804 : Une demi-heure de caprice
 1804 : Achille à Scyros
 1806 : Paul et Virginie
 1808 : Vénus et Adonis
 1808 : Alexandre chez Apelles
 1809 : La Fête de Mars
 1810 : Vertumne et Pomone
 1810 : Persée et Andromède
 1812 : L'Enfant prodigue
 1814 : Le Retour des lys
 1815 : L'Heureux Retour
 1817 : Les Fiancé de Caserte
 1818 : Proserpine
 1818 : Zirphile
 1818 : La Servante justifiée

References

External links
His ballets and their 18th century productions on CESAR

1758 births
1840 deaths
French ballet masters
French male ballet dancers
French choreographers
Ballet choreographers
Musicians from Nancy, France
18th-century French ballet dancers
Paris Opera Ballet étoiles
19th-century French ballet dancers
Paris Opera Ballet artistic directors